Chirano Gold Mine is an underground and open pit gold mine in the Western Region of Ghana, within the Bibiani gold belt. It is 90% owned by Toronto-based Kinross Gold Corporation. The Government of Ghana has a 10% carried interest.

Description 
The Chirano Gold Mine is located in southwestern Ghana, approximately 100 kilometres southwest of Kumasi, Ghana's second largest city.

Chirano was explored and developed from 1996 by Red Back Mining NL, an Australian company that moved to a Canadian listing in April 2004. Chirano began production in October 2005. Kinross Gold acquired the mine on 17 September 2010 through a US$7.1 billion takeover of Red Back Mining, through which it also acquired the Tasiast Gold Mine in Mauritania.  The mine comprises the Akwaaba, Suraw, Akoti South, Akoti North, Akoti Extended, Paboase, Tano, Obra South, Obra, Sariehu and Mamnao open pits and the Akwaaba and Paboase underground mines.

Open pit and underground ore are processed at the Chirano plant. The capacity of the mill is approximately 3.5 million tonnes per annum. Processing involves crushing, ball mill grinding, cyanide leaching and carbon-in-leach (CIL) extraction.

At 31 December 2012, Chirano's Proven and Probable Reserves were 20.271 million tonnes at 2.65 g/t gold for 1.722 million ounces, with an additional 0.44 million ounces of Measured and Indicated Resource.

2012 gold equivalent production was 263,911 ounces at a cost of sale of US$721/oz. 2012 recoveries averaged 93%.

See also
Geology of Ghana
Birimian

References

Gold mines in Ghana
Kinross Gold
Surface mines in Ghana
Underground mines in Ghana
Western Region (Ghana)